Zodiac Nautic is a French company best known for their widely-used inflatable boats.

Zodiac Nautic finds its origins in the “Zodiac airships and aviation French company”, specialized in the production of airships. In the 1930s Pierre Debroutelle, one of its engineers, invented one of the first prototypes of inflatable boats for the Aéronavale.
In the 1960s, the company turned to the leisure industry to accommodate the “vacationers” and their growing interest in recreational boating.

In financial trouble, the company was sold to private owners in 2015.

Zodiac boat 

The buoyancy tubes of Zodiac boats have several compartments, separated by waterproof partitions. Thanks to its important air reserves, the boat keeps its ability to float and stays conceptually unsinkable when fully loaded, even with a deflated compartment.

Zodiac inflatable boats are commonly used by the United States Military, however, these are Zodiac Milpro (Military and Professional) boats, which is a separate company also created during the breakup of the Zodiac Group in 2007.

Zodiac boats were brought into American popular culture in the late 1960s.  They were ubiquitous in the popular television documentary series, The Undersea World of Jacques Cousteau.

The word "ZODIAC" is a registered trademark for rigid-hulled inflatable boats.

References

French boat builders
Inflatable boat manufacturers
The Carlyle Group